Erling Stoud Platou (August 30, 1896 – June 17, 1958) was an American standout college basketball player at the University of Minnesota and, later, a pediatrician at the University of Minnesota Medical Center.

As a guard on the basketball team, Platou led the 1918–19 Golden Gophers to an undefeated season (13–0 overall, 10–0 conference) by averaging a then-remarkable 11.6 points per game. In the early days of basketball, such a scoring average was unheard of, and it was his prowess that earned him the Helms Foundation National Player of the Year honor that season as a junior. The Helms Foundation also awarded Minnesota a retroactive national championship years later for the 1918–19 season.

Platou's basketball career was disrupted due to World War I. He played on the team in 1914–15 and 1915–16, but then the war temporarily ceased all intercollegiate sports at Minnesota. They resumed play in 1918–19, and Platou finished his career in 1919–20 before graduating that spring.

References

1896 births
1958 deaths
All-American college men's basketball players
American pediatricians
Basketball players from North Dakota
College men's track and field athletes in the United States
Guards (basketball)
Minnesota Golden Gophers football players
Minnesota Golden Gophers men's basketball players
People from Barnes County, North Dakota
University of Minnesota faculty
American men's basketball players